Abraham Robinson (born Robinsohn; October 6, 1918 – April 11, 1974) was a mathematician who is most widely known for development of nonstandard analysis, a mathematically rigorous system whereby infinitesimal and infinite numbers were reincorporated into modern mathematics. Nearly half of Robinson's papers were in applied mathematics rather than in pure mathematics.

Biography
He was born to a Jewish family with strong Zionist beliefs, in Waldenburg, Germany, which is now Wałbrzych, in Poland. In 1933, he emigrated to British Mandate of Palestine, where he earned a first degree from the Hebrew University. Robinson was in France when the Nazis invaded during World War II, and escaped by train and on foot, being alternately questioned by French soldiers suspicious of his German passport and asked by them to share his map, which was more detailed than theirs. While in London, he joined the Free French Air Force and contributed to the war effort by teaching himself aerodynamics and becoming an expert on the airfoils used in the wings of fighter planes.

After the war, Robinson worked in London, Toronto, and Jerusalem, but ended up at the University of California, Los Angeles in 1962.

Work in model theory
He became known for his approach of using the methods of mathematical logic to attack problems in analysis and abstract algebra. He "introduced many of the fundamental notions of model theory". Using these methods, he found a way of using formal logic to show that there are self-consistent nonstandard models of the real number system that include infinite and infinitesimal numbers. Others, such as Wilhelmus Luxemburg, showed that the same results could be achieved using ultrafilters, which made Robinson's work more accessible to mathematicians who lacked training in formal logic. Robinson's book Non-standard Analysis was published in 1966. Robinson was strongly interested in the history and philosophy of mathematics, and often remarked that he wanted to get inside the head of Leibniz, the first mathematician to attempt to articulate clearly the concept of infinitesimal numbers.

While at UCLA his colleagues remember him as working hard to accommodate PhD students of all levels of ability by finding them projects of the appropriate difficulty. He was courted by Yale, and after some initial reluctance, he moved there in 1967. In the Spring of 1973 he was a member of the Institute for Advanced Study. He died of pancreatic cancer in 1974.

See also

Notes

Publications

References
 J. W. Dauben (1998) Abraham Robinson: The Creation of Nonstandard Analysis, A Personal and Mathematical Odyssey, Princeton University Press 
 G. D. Mostow (1976) Abraham Robinson 1918 — 1974, Israel Journal of Mathematics 25(1/2): 5–14 
 A. D. Young, S. Cochen, Stephan Körner & Peter Roquette (1976) "Abraham Robinson", Bulletin of the London Mathematical Society 8(3): 307–23

External links

 
 Kutateladze S.S., Abraham Robinson, the creator of nonstandard analysis

1918 births
1974 deaths
20th-century American mathematicians
Alumni of the University of London
20th-century German mathematicians
Jewish emigrants from Nazi Germany to Mandatory Palestine
German emigrants to the United States
People from Wałbrzych
University of California, Los Angeles faculty
Yale University faculty
Brouwer Medalists
Mathematical logicians
Model theorists
Institute for Advanced Study visiting scholars
Yale Sterling Professors